Oxygen fluorides are compounds of elements oxygen and fluorine with the general formula , where n = 1 to 6. Many different oxygen fluorides are known:

oxygen difluoride
dioxygen difluoride 
trioxygen difluoride or ozone difluoride
tetraoxygen difluoride 
pentaoxygen difluoride 
hexaoxygen difluoride
dioxygen monofluoride or fluoroperoxyl

Oxygen fluorides are strong oxidizing agents with high energy and can release their energy either instantaneously or at a controlled rate. Thus, these compounds attracted much attention as potential fuels in jet propulsion systems.

Synthesis 
Here are some synthesis methods and reactions of the three most common oxygen fluorides – oxygen difluoride, dioxygen difluoride and ozone difluoride.

Oxygen difluoride

A common preparative method involves fluorination of sodium hydroxide:

 is a colorless gas at room temperature and a yellow liquid below 128 K. Oxygen difluoride has an irritating odor and is poisonous. It reacts quantitatively with aqueous haloacids to give free halogens:

It can also displace halogens from their salts. It is both an effective fluorinating agent and a strong oxidizing agent. When reacted with unsaturated nitrogen fluorides with electrical discharge, it results in the formation of nitrogen trifluoride, oxide fluorides and other oxides.

Dioxygen difluoride 

 (electric discharge, 183 °C)

 reacts violently with red phosphorus, even at −196 °C. Explosions can also occur if Freon-13 is used to moderate the reaction.

Trioxygen difluoride or ozone difluoride

 is a viscous, blood-red liquid.

Like the other oxygen fluorides,  is endothermic and decomposes at about 115 K with the evolution of heat, which is given by the following reaction:

 is safer to work with than ozone, and can be evaporated, or thermally decomposed, or exposed to electric sparks, without any explosions. But on contact with organic matter or oxidizable compounds, it can detonate or explode. Thus, the addition of even one drop of ozone difluoride to solid anhydrous ammonia will result in a mild explosion, when they are both at 90 K each.

Fluoroperoxyl 
It has been reported to be produced from atomic fluorine and dioxygen.

General preparation of polyoxygen difluorides

Effects on ozone 
Oxygen- and fluorine-containing radicals like  and OF occur in the atmosphere. These along with other halogen radicals have been implicated in the destruction of ozone in the atmosphere. However, the oxygen monofluoride radicals are assumed to not play as big a role in the ozone depletion because free fluorine atoms in the atmosphere are believed to react with methane to produce hydrofluoric acid which precipitates in rain. This decreases the availability of free fluorine atoms for oxygen atoms to react with and destroy ozone molecules.

Net reaction:

Hypergolic propellant 
The mechanism involves the boiling off oxygen from the solution containing , making it more reactive to have a spontaneous reaction with the rocket fuel. The degree of reactivity is also dependent on the type of fuel used.

See also 

 Bromine oxide
 Chlorine oxide
 Iodine oxide
 Ozone

References

External links
National Pollutant Inventory - Fluoride and compounds fact sheet
Oxygen Fluoride PubChem
Center for Disease Control and Prevention - Health Hazards of Oxygen Difluoride

Oxygen compounds
Fluorides
Nonmetal halides
Chalcohalides